"Eve's Volcano (Covered in Sin)" is a song by the English singer-songwriter Julian Cope. It is the third and final single released in support of his album Saint Julian.

Formats and track listing 
All songs written by Julian Cope, except where noted.
UK 7" single (IS 318)
"Eve's Volcano (Covered in Sin)" – 3:50
"Almost Beautiful Child (I & II)" (De Harrison) – 5:23

UK 12" single (12 IS 318)
"Eve's Volcano (Covered in Sin)" – 3:50
"Almost Beautiful Child (I & II)" (De Harrison) – 5:23
"Pulsar N.X." [live] – 2:54
"Shot Down" [live] – 3:51

UK CD single (CID 318)
"Eve's Volcano (Covered in Sin)" – 3:50
"Almost Beautiful Child (I & II)" (De Harrison) – 5:23
"Pulsar N.X." [live] – 2:54
"Shot Down" [live] – 3:51
"Spacehopper — Annexe" – 4:51

UK 12" remix single (12 ISX 318)
"Eve's Volcano - !Vulcano Lungo!" – 6:53
"Spacehopper — Annexe" – 4:51
"Almost Beautiful Child (I & II)" (De Harrison) – 5:23

Chart positions

References

External links 
 

1987 singles
Julian Cope songs
1987 songs
Songs written by Julian Cope